Zack Baranski, born December 18, 1992, is an American professional basketball player who plays for the Alvark Tokyo of the B.League in Japan.

Career statistics 

|-
| align="left" | 2014–15
| align="left" | Toyota
|12 ||– ||7.2 ||.571  || .167 ||.571 || 1.3 || 0.1|| 0.7 ||0.0  || 3.1
|-
| align="left" | 2015–16
| align="left" | Toyota
|43 ||8 ||12.3 ||.414 || .366 ||.500 || 2.2 || 0.6 || 0.4 ||0.1 ||5.2
|-
| align="left" | 2016–17
| align="left" | A Tokyo
|60 ||12 || 22.1 ||.426  || .326 ||.594||3.9 || 1.0 || 0.8 ||3.4  ||9.1
|-
| align="left" | 2017–18
| align="left" | A Tokyo
|57 ||8 || 18.7 ||.402  || .394 ||.711  || 2.4 || 1.2 || 0.9 ||0.1  || 5.7
|-
|}

References

External links
is fluent in Japanese

1992 births
Living people
Tokai University alumni
Alvark Tokyo players
American expatriate basketball people in Japan
American men's basketball players
Sportspeople from Nagano Prefecture
Sportspeople from Tochigi Prefecture
Forwards (basketball)